Mahfuzur Rahman Litu was born 3 September 1973 is a Bangladeshi cricket umpire.

Umpiring career
Rahman officiates First Class and List-A matches in Bangladesh. Since 2012 he stands as umpire in Bangladesh Premier League. Till 2017–18 Bangladesh Premier League he has officiated 34 matches in BPL. In  2017 BPL, Sylhet Sixers lodged a complain against him after a 7-ball over by Kamrul Islam due to his err in ball counting and the team eventually lost the game. In the same tournament Sabbir Rahman was penalised after using abusing Rahman for adjusting him LBW.

References

External links
 

1995 births
Living people
Bangladeshi cricket umpires
People from Dhaka District